Surogat (known in English as Ersatz and The Substitute) is a 1961 Yugoslav short animated film by Croatian director Dušan Vukotić, produced by Zagreb Film, then a Yugoslav film production company. The film is also known by several other names in other languages: Cyррогат, Der Ersatz, Le Succēdanē and Surrogatto.

Plot
A man takes a trip to the beach and every object he brings with him, no matter how unlikely, is inflatable.

Accolades
The film won an Academy Award for Short Subjects (Cartoons) in 1962.

Legacy

Preservation 
The Academy Film Archive preserved Ersatz in 2012.

In popular culture 
According to producer David Silverman, The Simpsons the character design for the in-show cartoon "Worker and Parasite" in the 22nd episode of the series 4, 'Krusty Gets Kancelled', was based on Surogat. Simpson's creator Matt Groening said it was one of his favorite moments from The Simpsons.

References

External links
 
 
 Surogat on YouTube

1961 films
1961 animated films
1960s animated short films
Best Animated Short Academy Award winners
Animated films without speech
Films directed by Dušan Vukotić
Yugoslav animated short films
Zagreb Film films
Croatian animated short films